Myurellopsis monicae is a species of sea snail, a marine gastropod mollusc in the family Terebridae, the auger snails.

Description
The length of the shell attains 9.9 mm.

Distribution
This marine species occurs off Réunion.

References

 Terryn Y. 2005. Terebra monicae sp. nov., a new Terebridae species from Reunion Island. Gloria Maris, 44(5): 104–109

External links
 Fedosov, A. E.; Malcolm, G.; Terryn, Y.; Gorson, J.; Modica, M. V.; Holford, M.; Puillandre, N. (2020). Phylogenetic classification of the family Terebridae (Neogastropoda: Conoidea). Journal of Molluscan Studies.

Terebridae
Gastropods described in 2005